Valeriy Mikhaylovich Priyomykhov (19432000) was a Soviet and Russian actor, film director, screenwriter and author.

Awards 
Winner of USSR State Prize:
 1984 – for the film  Boys   
 1989 — for the film Cold Summer of 1953 
 1988 – Best Actor in a     Soviet Screen Magazine
 1993 – Honoured Art Worker of the Russian Federation
 1999 – Nika Award – Nomination for Best Screenplay – for the film Who If Not Us
 1999 – Special Prize of 45-th International Film Festival in Taormina (Italy) – for the film Who If Not Us
 2000 – Winner of State Prize of the Russian Federation – for work for children and young people

Filmography

Director
 Pants (Штаны) (1988)
 Migrants (Мигранты) (1991)
 Who If Not Us (Кто, если не мы) (1998)

Actor (selected)
 Dear, Dearest, Beloved, Unique... (Милый, дорогой, любимый, единственный) (1984)
 A Simple Death (Простая смерть) (1985)
 Cold Summer of 1953 (Холодное лето пятьдесят третьего) (1987)
 Time for Sorrow Hasn't Come Yet (1995)
 Crusader (Крестоносец) (1995)
 Mama Don't Cry (Мама не горюй) (1998)
 Who If Not Us (Кто, если не мы) (1998)

Writer (selected)
 Dear, Dearest, Beloved, Unique... (Милый, дорогой, любимый, единственный) (1984)
 Pants (Штаны) (1988)
 Migrants (Мигранты) (1991)
 Crusader (Крестоносец) (1995)
 Who If Not Us (Кто, если не мы) (1998)

References

External links 
 Biography of Priyomykhov in Russian
 

1943 births
2000 deaths
People from Belogorsk, Amur Oblast
Russian male film actors
Russian film directors
Soviet male film actors
Soviet film directors
Burials at Kuntsevo Cemetery
Soviet screenwriters
State Prize of the Russian Federation laureates
Recipients of the USSR State Prize
Recipients of the Nika Award
Deaths from brain tumor
Deaths from cancer in Russia
20th-century Russian screenwriters
Male screenwriters
20th-century Russian male writers